Béatrice Edwige (born 3 October 1988) is a French handball player for Ferencvárosi TC and the French national team.

She competed at the 2015 World Women's Handball Championship in Denmark.

Achievements
French Championship:
Winner: 2014, 2017, 2018, 2019
French Cup:
Winner: 2017, 2019
Finalist: 2013
French League Cup:
Finalist: 2016
Nemzeti Bajnokság I:
Finalist: 2021, 2022
Magyar Kupa:
Winner: 2021, 2022
Russia SuperCup:
Winner: 2021
EHF Champions League:
Finalist: 2021
Semifinalist: 2019

Individual awards
 All-Star Team Best Defense Player of the 2016 European Women's Handball Championship
Championnat de France Best Defense Player: 2015, 2019
Championnat de France Best Line Player: 2019

References

External links

1988 births
Living people
Handball players from Paris
French people of French Guianan descent
French female handball players
Handball players at the 2016 Summer Olympics
Handball players at the 2020 Summer Olympics
Olympic handball players of France
Olympic medalists in handball
Olympic gold medalists for France
Olympic silver medalists for France
Medalists at the 2016 Summer Olympics
Medalists at the 2020 Summer Olympics
European champions for France
Expatriate handball players
French expatriate sportspeople in Hungary
Győri Audi ETO KC players
Ferencvárosi TC players (women's handball)